Sofía Toccalino  (born 20 March 1997) is an Argentine field hockey player and part of the Argentina national team. She plays with the Argentina national field hockey team, winning silver medal at the 2020 Summer Olympics.

Career 
She competed at the 2016 Women's Hockey Junior World Cup, winning the gold medal.
On club level she plays for St. Catherine's in Argentina.

She won a gold medal at the 2019 Pan American Games.

References

External links

1997 births
Living people
Las Leonas players
Argentine people of Italian descent
Field hockey players at the 2014 Summer Youth Olympics
Argentine female field hockey players
Place of birth missing (living people)
South American Games gold medalists for Argentina
South American Games silver medalists for Argentina
South American Games medalists in field hockey
Competitors at the 2018 South American Games
Competitors at the 2022 South American Games
Field hockey players at the 2019 Pan American Games
Pan American Games gold medalists for Argentina
Pan American Games medalists in field hockey
Medalists at the 2019 Pan American Games
Field hockey players at the 2020 Summer Olympics
Olympic field hockey players of Argentina
Olympic silver medalists for Argentina
Medalists at the 2020 Summer Olympics
Olympic medalists in field hockey
21st-century Argentine women